Pandaga ( Festival) is a 1998 Telugu-language drama film directed by Sarath. It stars Akkineni Nageswara Rao, Srikanth, Raasi  and music composed by M. M. Keeravani. It is produced under the Jayasri Art Pictures banner. It is a remake of the Malayalam film Katha Nayagan (1997).

Plot
The film begins on Suryadevara Lakshmi Raghava Vara Prasad (Akkineni Nageswara Rao) a top-tier holds high esteem in the society. He is also paterfamilias to a large extended joint family who is unmarried, shoulders his 5 sisters and their respective families. However, they usurp for his wealth under the guise of serving him. Once Vara Prasad is rescued by a young guy Anand (Srikanth) from a few burglars. Just after, he is impressed by virtue of Anand and appoints him as Manager of his house. Time being, Anand wins Vara Prasad's credence and obtains household authority. Besides, Prameela (Raasi) one of the nieces of Vara Prasad piety quarrels with Anand. After some time, Vara Prasad realizes Anand as a forge, one that trapped him with his excellence, so, he boots him. Thereupon, he notices his ex-lover Vijayalakshmi's (Jayasudha) photograph with him. Here as a flabbergast, it is revealed, Anand as Vara Prasad's son who walked in, to pay back his father for deceiving his mother. Soon, Vara Prasad clarifies it's an error of fortune. At present, Anand proclaims Vara Prasad to accept him as his son when he dichotomizes as his honor & family prestige obstruct him. But Anand challenges to divulge reality. At that moment, Prameela overhears the conversation, apologizes Anand and they fall in love. Thereafter, Anand raises chaos in the family and brings out the true faces of his sly relatives. Meanwhile, Vara Prasad decides to declare his heir on the occasion of his 60th birthday and ultimately, he affirms the actuality. Learning it, Vara Prasad's sisters accuse and their riffraff husbands poison him but on time Anand saves his father. At last, Vara Prasad handovers his property to them and ready to leave when they all plead pardon and change his intention. Finally, the movie ends on a happy note with the marriage of Anand & Prameela.

Cast

 Akkineni Nageswara Rao as Vara Prasad 
 Srikanth as Anand
 Raasi as Prameela
 Padmanabham as Vara Prasad's brother-in-law
 M. Balayya as Raghava
 Sudhakar as Military Officer
 Tanikella Bharani as Sai Babu
 Babu Mohan as Saidulu
 M. S. Narayana as Mallayya
 Venu Madhav as Venu
 Chalapathi Rao as Venkateswara Rao
 Rallapalli as Sambasiva Rao
 Costumes Krishna as Radha Krishna
 Chitti Babu
 Ananth as Prasad's nephew
 Gundu Hanumantha Rao
 Bandla Ganesh as Ganesh
 Tirupathi Prakash as Prasad's nephew
 Subbaraya Sharma as Lawyer
 K. K. Sarma
 Annapurna as Anasuya
 Rama Prabha as Prabhavati
 Srilakshmi as Rukmini
 Shanoor Sana
 Rajitha
 Kalpana Rai as Servant
 Nirmalamma as Koteshwaramma
 Y. Vijaya as Savitri

Soundtrack

Music composed by M. M. Keeravani. Music released on Supreme Music Company.

Reception
Griddaluru Gopalrao of Zamin Ryot gave a positive review for the film. He praised the performance of Nageswara Rao in particular in addition to Srikanth, Bharani and Babu Mohan. In a retrospective review, GVK of India Herald wrote that director Sarath has executed emotional scenes with heart.

Notes

References

External links
 

1990s Telugu-language films
1998 romantic drama films
1998 films
Films directed by Sarath
Films scored by M. M. Keeravani
Indian romantic drama films
Telugu remakes of Malayalam films